Tikiribanda Harindranatha "Harindra" Dunuwille (born 29 September 1946) is a Sri Lankan lawyer and politician. He was a former member of parliament (1989–1994), former Deputy Minister of State for Constitutional Affairs (1989–93), and Mayor of Kandy (1997–2002).

Born to a prominent family in Kandy, Dunuwille was educated at Trinity College, Kandy and Ceylon Law College. A keen sportsmen he won the coveted Trinity Lion in 1966 and was also the president of the Students Union at the Ceylon Law College.

Starting a successful legal practice in Kandy, he went on to become the president of the Kandy Bar Association and the vice-president of the Bar Association of Sri Lanka.

He entered politics in the 1980s and was elected to the Kandy Municipal Council and served as the Mayor of Kandy for two consecutive terms. From 1989 to 1994 he was a Member of Parliament and served as the Deputy Minister of State for
Constitutional Affairs.

He is a cousin of the actress Iranganie Serasinghe.

References

External links
Harindra Dunuwille

Government ministers of Sri Lanka
Members of the 9th Parliament of Sri Lanka
Mayors of Kandy
Sinhalese lawyers
United National Party politicians
Alumni of Ceylon Law College
Alumni of Trinity College, Kandy
Living people
1946 births